Betty White: A Celebration, originally titled Betty White: 100 Years Young – A Birthday Celebration, is an American documentary film about the actress Betty White. It was released in theaters on what would have been her 100th birthday, January 17, 2022. White died on December 31, 2021.

Production
In December 2021, it was announced that White's 100th birthday would be celebrated with a new documentary-style movie about her life and career. The title was revealed as Betty White: 100 Years Young – A Birthday Celebration in the same announcement.

The announced cast includes many of White's friends: Ryan Reynolds, Tina Fey, Robert Redford, Lin-Manuel Miranda, Clint Eastwood, Morgan Freeman, Jay Leno, Carol Burnett, Craig Ferguson, Jimmy Kimmel, Valerie Bertinelli, James Corden, Wendie Malick, and Jennifer Love Hewitt. The film was reformatted after White's death, focusing more greatly on the final interview she gave for it, said by the production company to give "a backstage look at her career, and insights into what was most important to her."

Release and marketing
The release plan was announced at the same time as the film, set to be shown in theatres across the United States on January 17, 2022, marking White's centenary. The film would be released on the scheduled date.

People magazine featured White as the cover story of their January 2022 newsstand publication, anticipating the milestone. This magazine was published on December 29, 2021, two days before White's death. In an interview with People featured in the magazine, White commented that she was "so lucky to be in such good health and feel so good at this age. It's amazing."

Following White's death, producers Steve Boettcher and Mike Trinklein of the event distributors Fathom Events announced in a Facebook post that the pre-filmed production would be going on as scheduled:

On January 3, 2022, it was confirmed that the film was still to be released as planned on January 17, 2022. The announcement also gave the updated name of the film as Betty White: A Celebration. Upon its release, Betty White: A Celebration would be screened in 900 theaters.

References

External links
 
 

Documentary films about actors
Documentary films about comedy and comedians
Documentary films about women in film
2022 documentary films
2020s English-language films
Betty White